Arthur Grant may refer to:

Arthur James Grant (1862–1948), English historian
 Sir Arthur Grant, 10th Baronet (1879–1931), of Monymusk, Aberdeen
Arthur Grant (cinematographer) (1915–1972), British cinematographer
Art Grant (ice hockey) (1919–1943), Canadian ice hockey player
 Art Grant (baseball) (fl. 1922), catcher in the American Negro league
Arthur Grant (footballer) (born 1957), former Scottish football winger

See also